At 8 am on 18 January 2004, a suicide bombing occurred in the Green Zone in Karkh, Baghdad, Iraq. The bomber exploded a 500kg bomb in a Toyota pickup truck outside while in a queue of vehicles waiting to enter the main United States headquarters. The attack killed 24 people, injured dozens of others and set cars on fire.

References

2004 murders in Iraq
21st-century mass murder in Iraq
Mass murder in 2004